Air Expeditionary Wings and Groups are a Wing/Group concept used by the United States Air Force.  These units are activated under temporary orders by the owning Major Command (MAJCOM) for a specific purpose or mission. Once that mission is completed, these units are inactivated.

Origins
Faced with declining budgets in the late 1990s, the U.S. Air Force decided that the Operation Northern Watch and Operation Southern Watch (ONW/OSW) patrols over Iraq were "tedious". The patrols placed more strain on units worldwide than during the Cold War. This was because so many fighter, bomber, air refueling, and airlift squadrons had been inactivated after the end of the Cold War. The Air Force "had to change the way it did business".

As the no-fly zone patrols over Iraq began to appear as an ongoing, open-ended commitment, the drain on equipment and manpower forced the Air Force to reconsider how it was going to sustain ONW/OSW patrols, as well as other required deployments worldwide. The answer developed was to end the deployment of entire wings en bloc.

It was decided that U.S. Central Command Air Forces (CENTAF) would not consist of permanently assigned units, partially because of the sensitivities of Arab host states to acknowledging that U.S. forces were deployed in their countries. This made establishment of permanent units more difficult, because base access might be changed or denied with shifting, volatile, political currents. For example, during the 2003 invasion of Iraq, the Jordanian government denied U.S. troops were stationed in Jordan. This created a lot of concern with Jordanian military personnel stationed at Shahid Muafaq Al-Salti Air Base during the initial stages. As they were being told on television and radio that there were no U.S. troops on Jordanian soil, USAF C-17 aircraft were arriving on a daily basis with personnel and supplies. The 410th Air Expeditionary Wing was quickly growing in size. Out of confusion, Jordanian Security Forces documented everything leaving the aircraft. U.S. personnel removed labels and explosive decals from the containers, as not to aggravate the situation. American troops initially were not allowed to carry weapons in plain sight. So they carried their Beretta 9mm handguns hidden in their waistbands for protection and hid their M-4 carbines from view in their vehicles.

To minimize the risk of these kind of situations happening, the decision was taken to avoid the creation of permanent units, especially in the Middle East.

Instead, elements from different wings, even from both the active-duty component and the Air Force Reserves and Air National Guard, would be melded together for each deployment. This merging of different units from different permanent wings/groups was christened the "Air Expeditionary Force" (AEF) concept. The various units were to be drawn from Air Combat Command or ACC gained components, but also from other major commands such as Pacific Air Forces (PACAF) or United States Air Forces in Europe (USAFE), as necessary, to meet mission requirements. AEF organizations were to be fundamentally temporary in nature, organized to meet a specific mission or commitment.  They thus replaced the "Provisional" deployed units attached to the command during the 1991 (Persian) Gulf War.

Active Air Expeditionary wings and groups

Inactive Air Expeditionary wings and groups

Notes

References
Air Force Instruction 38-101, AIR FORCE ORGANIZATION, 4 APRIL 2006 (with Change 2, dated 20 July 2006, and later).

Air expeditionary units of the United States Air Force
Air Expeditionary Wings